EF-5 may refer to:
 18F-EF5, a chemical compound used in oncology research
 EF5, the highest rating on the Enhanced Fujita scale of tornado strength
 Milwaukee Road class EP-1, EF-1, EF-2, EF-3, and EF-5, a type of railroad engine